Samuel Belkin (December 12, 1911 – April 19, 1976) was the second President of Yeshiva University. An American Rabbi and distinguished Torah scholar, he is credited with leading Yeshiva University through a period of substantial expansion.

Biography
Belkin was born in 1911 in Svislach, Russian Empire (now Belarus) and studied in the yeshivas of Slonim and Mir. Recognized at a young age as an illui, a genius, he was ordained as a Rabbi at the age of seventeen by the famed Yisrael Meir Kagan, the Chofetz Chaim. He also studied for a time in the Mir.

As a child, he sought to leave Poland after he witnessed his father being shot by a policeman in 1919. He emigrated to the United States in 1929, studied with Harry Austryn Wolfson at Harvard and received his doctorate (concerned with the writings of Philo) at Brown University in 1935, one of the first awarded for Judaic studies in American academia. In 1940, an elaboration of his Ph.D. thesis was published with the title "Philo and the Oral Law — The Philonic Interpretation of Biblical Law in Relation to the Palestinian Halakah."

He then joined the faculty of Yeshiva College, New York, where he taught Greek. He became a full professor in 1940 and was appointed dean of its Rabbi Isaac Elchanan Theological Seminary (RIETS) the same year. In 1943, Belkin was named became president of the college, Under his guidance, the institution expanded to become Yeshiva University in 1945. Belkin was a visionary who transformed Yeshiva from a small college and rabbinical seminary into a significant institution of considerable stature in Judaic Studies, natural and social sciences, and the humanities. Under his presidency, the Albert Einstein College of Medicine was opened as Yeshiva University's medical school.

As a scholar, he published many works on Jewish law and Hellenistic literature. His most significant published works are  "Philo and the Oral Law" and "In His Image: The Jewish Philosophy of Man as Expressed in Rabbinic Tradition".

In his work, "In His Image," Dr. Belkin described Judaism as a Democratic Theocracy — a theocracy because the first principle of Jewish thought describes the Kingship of God, and a democracy because the Written and the Oral Law emphasize the infinite worth of each human being.

Belkin stepped down as university president in 1975. He died in 1976 in New York City after an illness. He was 64.

Legacy

The Benjamin N. Cardozo School of Law gives an award to one graduating law student each year in Dr. Belkin's honor. The award recognizes the student who exemplifies the combination of excellence in leadership, scholarship and exceptional contribution to the growth and development of the law school. Past recipients of the Dr. Samuel Belkin Award include:

Marlene Besterman (1986) 
Frank M. Esposito (1994)
Matthew J. Kluger (1994)
Magda M. Jimenez (1995)
Thomas Harding (1996)
Vsevolod "Steve" Maskin (2000)
Alan Gotthelf (2001)
Brandyne S. Warren (2005)
Kimberly N. Grant (2007)
Meghan DuPuis Maurus (2008)
Jil Simon (2013), and
 Francesca Rebecca Acocella (2016)

Bibliography
Belkin, Samuel. In His Image — The Jewish Philosophy of Man as Expressed in Rabbinic Tradition. London, New York, Abelard-Schuman [1960]
Belkin, Samuel. Philo and the Oral Law — the Philonic Interpretation of Biblical Law in Relation to the Palestinian Halakah. Cambridge, Massachusetts, Harvard University Press, 1940.
Belkin, Samuel. The Philosophy of Purpose. New York, Yeshiva University, 1958.
Belkin, Samuel. Midrash ha-Shemot be-Filon. [New York, 1956]
Belkin, Samuel. Essays in Traditional Jewish thought. New York: Philosophical Library [c. 1956]
Belkin, Samuel. Midrash She´elot u-Teshuvot `al Bereshit u-Shemot le-Filon ha-Aleksandroni. New York, 1960.
Yeshiva University. Inauguration of Rabbi Samuel Belkin, Ph.D., as President, Tuesday Afternoon, May Twenty-Third, Nineteen Hundred and Forty-Four, at Three O'clock, in the Nathan Lamport Auditorium. Easton, Pa., Printed by Mack Printing, 1945.

References
Samuel Belkin , The Museum of the Jewish People at Beit Hatfutsot
Samuel Belkin's Application to RIETS, yucommentator.com
Samuel Belkin, Jewish Virtual Library, www.jewishvirtuallibrary.org
Halachic article by Belkin (hebrew) from the journal Talpiyot

Notes

1911 births
1976 deaths
People from Svislach
People from Volkovyssky Uyezd
Jews from the Russian Empire
Belarusian Jews
Polish emigrants to the United States
American people of Belarusian-Jewish descent
Presidents of Yeshiva University
Yeshiva University rosh yeshivas
Mir Yeshiva alumni
Brown University alumni